The 1982 NCAA Division I Wrestling Championships were the 52nd NCAA Division I Wrestling Championships to be held. Iowa State University in Ames, Iowa hosted the tournament at Hilton Coliseum.

Iowa took home the team championship with 131.75 points and having three individual champions.

Mark Schultz of Oklahoma was named the Most Outstanding Wrestler and Gary Albright of Nebraska received the Gorriaran Award.

Team results

Individual finals

References

NCAA Division I Wrestling Championship
NCAA
Wrestling competitions in the United States
NCAA Division I  Wrestling Championships
NCAA Division I  Wrestling Championships
NCAA Division I  Wrestling Championships